Sakura Genesis is an upcoming professional wrestling event promoted by New Japan Pro-Wrestling (NJPW). The event will take place on April 8, 2023, in Tokyo at Ryōgoku Kokugikan. Previously held under the Invasion Attack name, this will be the fourth event to be held under the Sakura Genesis name.

The event will see Kazuchika Okada defending the IWGP World Heavyweight Championship against the 2023 New Japan Cup winner.

Production

Storylines 
Sakura Genesis will feature professional wrestling matches that involve different wrestlers from pre-existing scripted feuds and storylines. Wrestlers portray villains, heroes, or less distinguishable characters in the scripted events that build tension and culminate in a wrestling match or series of matches.

On January 8, 2023, NJPW announced the New Japan Cup dates with the participants being announced on February 13. With the winner receiving an IWGP World Heavyweight Championship match at Sakura Genesis.

Matches

See also
 2023 in professional wrestling
 List of major NJPW events

References

External links 
 Official New Japan Pro-Wrestling's website

2023 in professional wrestling
2023 in Tokyo
2023
April 2023 sports events in Japan